Delyth Evans born 17 March 1958, Cardiff was the Labour National Assembly for Wales member for Mid and West Wales between 2000 and 2003.

Education
She attended Ysgol Gyfun Rhydfelen (near Pontypridd) and the University of Wales, Aberystwyth (BA Hons - French)

Professional career
A former management consultant and BBC and HTV journalist, she worked on the BBC's World at One and PM programmes before becoming an assistant to Gordon Brown MP in 1992. and policy adviser and speechwriter to the former Labour leader John Smith, 1992–1994, having joined the Labour Party in 1984.  Evans is also a former special adviser to Alun Michael.

Political career
She became the Assembly Member for Mid & West Wales in May 2000 following the resignation of Alun Michael (she was second on the Labour list for that region in the 1999 election) and was appointed Deputy Minister for Rural Affairs, Culture & the Environment on 24 July 2000 following the sacking of Christine Gwyther and the promotion of Carwyn Jones. Evans did not contest the 2003 election.

In September 2013 she was selected by the Labour party to fight the Carmarthen West and South Pembrokeshire seat in the 2015 General Election, losing to The Conservatives' Simon Hart.

References
 Delyth Evans, BBC News, 4 July 2000
 Alun Michael resigns from Welsh assembly, Independent, 16 March 2000

Offices held

References

1958 births
Politicians from Cardiff
Living people
Wales AMs 1999–2003
Welsh Labour members of the Senedd
Alumni of Aberystwyth University
Members of the Welsh Assembly Government
People educated at Ysgol Gyfun Garth Olwg